Preetika Chawla is an Indian Bollywood film actress. She started her career by starring in TV serials such as Mumbai Calling and Jyoti. She made her Bollywood debut in the 2010 film Shahrukh Bola "Khoobsurat Hai Tu", playing Laali, a die-hard fan of Bollywood megastar Shah Rukh Khan.

Filmography

References

External links 
 
 

Indian film actresses
Actresses from Mumbai
Actresses in Hindi cinema
Living people
Year of birth missing (living people)
21st-century Indian actresses
Indian television actresses
Actresses in Hindi television